Angela Marie Predhomme (born September 9, 1967) is an American singer-songwriter and music producer. Her first album, Angela Predhomme, was released in 2008, and she has since released four more independent albums: Don't Wonder, Let It Fall, Will, and her most recent, Love. Predhomme also released a holiday EP in 2017 called Holidayolio.

Her songs first gained recognition from television, film and advertising placements, most notably through features on Lifetime TV's  Dance Moms. with the songs "Epiphany" for JoJo Siwa's performance called "Faith Is All I Need," and the song "Let It Fall" for Daviana Fletcher's "Shades of Blue." Predhomme's song "So Easy" was featured in two major ad campaigns in Europe; first for ING Bank Śląski's  mobile app, and later in a commercial for the Fiat 500 car. Her song "Christmas Time with You," co-written by Paul Robert Thomas, is featured in the opening scenes of the Hallmark film, Christmas on Honeysuckle Lane. Predhomme's song "This Might Be Good" plays at the end of the film A Wedding Most Strange during the closing credits. Her songs are also heard in the background of many popular television shows, including The Voice, Switched at Birth, Pawn Stars, Here Comes Honey Boo Boo, What Not to Wear, and the America in Primetime series by Ron Howard.

Accolades
Songs written and performed by Predhomme have earned recognition in multiple national song contests. Her song "Always OK" (2019) ranked as a semi-finalist in the Song of the Year songwriting competition, and songs "Extra Day", "My New Favorite Song" and "This Might Be Good" were named finalists by Song of the Year. In addition, she was invited to New York to present as a finalist in an advertising music contest "The Sellout" during the industry event, Advertising Week.

Education
Predhomme received a B.S. degree from Eastern Michigan University in social sciences, where she graduated summa cum laude. She also has a M.A. degree in TESOL, teaching English to speakers of other languages, from Eastern Michigan University. She taught upper-level academic ESL (English as a second language) classes at Michigan State University for several years. Her background in linguistics helped her to easily transition into vocal diction and lyric writing.

Discography
 Angela Predhomme (2008)
 Don't Wonder (2011)
 Let It Fall (2013)
 So Easy (single) (2014)
 Will (2015)
 Hug (single) (2017)
Holidayolio (EP) (2017)
Sweet Delectable You (single) (2019)
Love (2019)

References

1967 births
Living people
Singer-songwriters from Michigan
American women singer-songwriters
American women pianists
American sopranos
American folk musicians
Feminist musicians
21st-century American women guitarists
21st-century American guitarists
American folk-pop singers
American television composers
20th-century American women guitarists
20th-century American guitarists
20th-century American pianists
20th-century American women singers
21st-century American women singers
21st-century American pianists
20th-century American singers
21st-century American singers